Arsen Bagdasaryan  is a Turkmenistani football defender who played for Turkmenistan in the 2004 Asian Cup. He also played for Köpetdag Aşgabat, Nisa Asgabat, Gazcy Gazojak.

External links 
 Football Database Profile

1977 births
Living people
Turkmenistan footballers
Turkmenistan international footballers
Turkmenistan people of Armenian descent
FK Köpetdag Aşgabat players
FC Nisa Aşgabat players
traktor Tashkent players
2004 AFC Asian Cup players
Footballers at the 2002 Asian Games
Association football defenders
Asian Games competitors for Turkmenistan
Ethnic Armenian sportspeople